Juanjo is a common Spanish contraction of Juan José and may refer to:

Juanjo (futsal player) (Juan José Angosto) (b. 1985), Spanish futsal player
Juanjo (footballer, born 1987) (Juan José García Martínez) (b. 1987), known as "Juanjo", Spanish footballer
Juanjo Bezares (Juan José Bezares Alarcón) (b. 1981), a Spanish footballer
Juanjo Camacho (b. 1980), Spanish footballer
Juanjo (footballer, born 1977) (Juanjo Carricondo) (b. 1977), Spanish footballer
Juanjo Ciércoles (b. 1988), a Spanish footballer
Juanjo Díaz (b. 1949), a Spanish football manager
Juanjo Domínguez (b. 1951), an Argentinian guitarist
Juanjo Enríquez (1950–2015), known as "Juanjo", a Spanish retired footballer and manager
Juanjo (footballer, born 1985) (Juanjo Expósito) (b. 1985), known as "Juanjo", a Spanish footballer
Juanjo González (b. 1973), known as "Juanjo", a Spanish retired footballer
Juanjo Mena (b. 1965), a Spanish conductor
Juanjo Muko (b. 1993), an Equatoguinean footballer
Juanjo Menéndez (1929–2003) was a Spanish actor
Juanjo Nieto (Juan José Nieto Zarzoso) (b. 1994), a Spanish footballer
Juanjo Pereira (Juan José Pereira Zambrano) (b. 1984), a Spanish footballer
Juanjo Puigcorbé (b. 1955), a Spanish actor

Juanjo Valencia (Juan José Valencia|), a Spanish retired footballer